Suolahti is a former town and municipality of Finland. It is located next to Lake Keitele in the province of Western Finland and is part of the Central Finland region. Suolahti was merged into Äänekoski together with Sumiainen in 2007.

History 

The village was initially known as Paadentaipale; the first mentions of the current name come from are from the 16th century . The opening of the railroad in 1898 industrialized Suolahti and increased the waterborne traffic on Keitele, for which Suolahti provided a railway harbour at its south end. The same year, a steam-mill started operating which was soon followed by other industrial facilities. This sped up population growth and urban development. In the first three decades of the 20th century, the population increased to two thousand. It gained town status in 1977.

Notable people from Suolahti
 Jaakko Kolmonen, popular TV chef
 Jack Smack, guitarist and backing vocalist of the Finnish rock band Private Line.
 , inventor and YouTube personality

Sister cities

Prior to a 2007 consolidation with Sumiainen to make Äänekoski, Suolahti was twinned with:
 Borovichi, Novgorod Oblast, Russia (status unknown)

References

External links 

Suolahti – Official site

Äänekoski
Populated places disestablished in 2007
Former municipalities of Finland